Visitors to the Republic of China (Taiwan) must obtain a visa or authorization in advance, unless they come from one of the visa exempt countries or countries whose nationals are eligible for visa on arrival. All visitors must hold a passport valid for 6 months (except citizens of Japan and the United States who are only required to hold a passport valid for the entire duration of stay).

Taiwan has special entry requirements to current or former nationals of the People's Republic of China (PRC, commonly known as China) who reside or previously resided in Mainland China. Furthermore, nationals of certain countries must follow different requirements for applications of visitor visas.

Right of abode

Although the ROC has only one type of nationality, not all ROC nationals have the right of abode in Taiwan. Under the Immigration Act, only those with household registration in Taiwan (nationals with household registration, or NWHRs) have the right of abode in Taiwan and can enter Taiwan without prior authorisation. Holding one of the documents listed below is sufficient to demonstrate such status:

 A Taiwan passport with the individual's National Identification Card number on the biodata page;
 Valid National Identification Card, household registration certificate, or household registration certificate transcript accompanied by a valid Taiwan passport without National ID number on the biodata page.

ROC nationals without household registration in Taiwan (NWOHRs) are ineligible to receive a National Identification Card and their passport would not contain their National ID number. To enter Taiwan, one must, in addition to a Taiwan passport, hold one of the following documents:

 A valid or expired entry permit affixed on the passport; or,
A Taiwanese Resident Certificate.

NWOHRs holding documentation listed below can obtain an entry permit on arrival:
 An added signing on the passport stating one's overseas Chinese status, or a letter stating such status; or
 A long-term residence (type F-2) or permanent residence (type F-5) Certificate of Alien Registration issued by South Korea.

Alternatively, they may enter Taiwan with their non-ROC passports without prior authorization if they also have nationalities of a visa-exempt country.

NWOHRs are subject to immigration control while in Taiwan, and can only remain in Taiwan for a limited time authorized by the entry permit or the immigration officer. Those without any of the above-listed documents will be denied entry to Taiwan.

Visa policy map

Visa exemption 
Holders of passports of the following 65 jurisdictions do not require a visa to visit Taiwan for trips shorter than the duration of stay indicated (duration of stay starts from the next day of arrival).

Taiwan grants visa-free access to holders of passports of all states with which it has full diplomatic relations.

The visa exemption does not apply for holders of emergency or temporary passports, except for citizens of Japan and the United States. Other visa exempt nationals holding such passports, however, would still be able to apply for a visa on arrival.

90 days
Holders of passports issued by the following 54 countries do not need a visa to visit Taiwan for trips less than 90 days:

1 — for British nationals, only British citizens are eligible.
2 — persons born in Mainland China are not eligible.
3 — for persons who acquired Marshallese citizenship at birth only.
4 — persons born in Afghanistan, Mainland China, Iran, Iraq, Libya, Nigeria, Pakistan, Syria and Yemen are not eligible.

30 days
Holders of passports issued by the following 8 countries do not need a visa to visit Taiwan for trips less than 30 days:

1 — persons born in Afghanistan, Mainland China, Iran, Iraq, Libya, Nigeria, Pakistan, Syria and Yemen are not eligible.

14 days
Holders of normal passports issued by the 3 following countries do not need a visa to visit Taiwan for trips less than 14 days. They must hold proof of funds and hotel reservation or contact information in Taiwan. Holders of diplomatic and official passports are not eligible and must obtain a visa.

Stateless permanent residents of Brunei holding Bruneian International Certificate of Identity (ICI) with a validity of at least 6 months are also exempt for 14 days. They must also hold proof of funds and hotel reservation or contact information in Taiwan.

Visa on arrival 
Nationals of  can obtain a visa on arrival to Taiwan without charge for a stay of up to 30 days.

In addition, holders of emergency or temporary passports with a validity of more than 6 months issued by visa-exempt countries are eligible for visa on arrival for a fee. The duration of stay is 30 days regardless of nationality and cannot be extended. This measure does not apply to holders of emergency or temporary passports issued by Japan or the United States as they are visa exempt.

Visa on arrival is only available at Taiwan Taoyuan International Airport. For passengers arriving at Taipei Songshan Airport, Kaohsiung International Airport or Taichung Airport, they would be issued a temporary entry permit and will have to apply for a visa at the Bureau of Consular Affairs (BOCA) headquarters in Taipei, any of the offices of Ministry of Foreign Affairs in Taiwan, or the BOCA office at Taiwan Taoyuan International Airport. Passengers without a visa will not be allowed to depart from Taiwan.

Any passenger arriving at a port of entry other than the one listed above will be denied entry.

Permanent residents of Hong Kong and Macau
Permanent residents of Hong Kong and/or Macau may be eligible for an Exit & Entry Permit upon arrival for NT$300 or may apply for an Entry Permit online at no cost to visit Taiwan for less than 30 days.

The requirements are
They were born in Hong Kong or Macau
They were born outside Hong Kong or Macau and have entered Taiwan at least once as a permanent resident of Hong Kong or Macau and:
 their last visit was in 1983 or later and thus recorded in the National Immigration Agency computer system; or
 their last visit was before 1983 and they hold the travel document used for that visit; or
 their last visit was before 1983 and they have first obtained proof of previous entry from the NIA
They hold one of the following travel documents with remaining validity of no less than 3 months at the time of arrival:
Hong Kong Special Administrative Region passport
British National (Overseas) passport
Macao Special Administrative Region passport; 
They do not hold passports issued by other nations or have additional nationalities (including other classes of British nationality). If they do, they are required to comply with visa requirements of their additional nationalities, except for Hong Kong residents who are allowed to have dual Chinese nationality and British National (Overseas) status (but not full British citizenship), and except for Macau residents who are allowed to have dual Chinese and Portuguese nationality (but only for Portuguese nationality obtained before the handover).
 Macau residents using a Portuguese passport may enter visa-free for 90 days, like any other Portuguese passport holder, and do not need to apply for a permit beforehand.

First time applicants not born in Hong Kong or Macau are also able to apply for Exit and Entry Permit online from 8 February 2017. Unlike those qualified for the no-fee Entry Permit or Entry and Exit Permit on arrival, the applicants are required to pay a processing fee of NT$600. The processing time is 5 business days. These visitors are required to hold their Hong Kong Permanent Identity Cards or Macau Permanent Resident Identity Cards, as well as their proof of previous visits to Taiwan, when applying for Exit and Entry Permits on arrival or the no-fee Entry Permits for subsequent visits.

Since 1 January 2017, Hong Kong and Macau residents are able to apply for double-entry Entry Permits online, providing that they are entering Taiwan by cruise for at least one portion of their trip.

To avoid the spread of nCoVirus, entry applications for Hong Kong and Macau residents are suspended from 7 February 2020 till 6 Nov 2022, from 7 Nov 2022 registered group tours are allowed entry for 15 days.

eVisa
Since 12 January 2016, the Ministry of Foreign Affairs of ROC started to implement the eVisa Program. Citizens of the following countries can apply for a single-entry eVisa to visit Taiwan for less than 30 days. The fee for each application is NT$1,632. On 7 October 2016, the Ministry of Foreign Affairs of ROC further expanded the list of countries eligible to apply for eVisa.

* – also eligible for visa on arrival.

Nationals of the following countries may apply for a single-entry eVisa for a maximum stay of 30 days if they are travelling with an approved tour group:

Also, all foreign nationals except Chinese nationals who are invited by the Taiwanese government to attend international conferences, sports events, trade fairs or other activities organized, co-organized or sponsored by Taiwanese government agencies or certain NGOs are also eligible for an eVisa. Such applicants must obtain an e-code from their host organizations in Taiwan prior to applying for an eVisa.

Nationals of the following countries are eligible for business eVisas if they have obtained recommendations from the local Taiwan External Trade Development Council since 1 June 2017.

APEC Business Travel Card
Holders of passports issued by the following countries who possess an APEC Business Travel Card (ABTC) containing the code "TWN" on the back of the card can enter Taiwan visa-free for business trips for up to 90 days.
ABTCs are issued to nationals of:

ABTCs are also issued to nationals of China and permanent residents of Hong Kong; however, Chinese nationals residing in Mainland China are subject to entry restrictions and cannot use the card to enter Taiwan. Chinese nationals permanently residing in Hong Kong are also ineligible and are required to obtain an Exit and Entry Permit.

Online Travel Authorization Certificate
Nationals of the following countries can apply for a no-fee Travel Authorization Certificate online for multiple visits to Taiwan, for a duration of no more than 14 days each visit during the certificate's 90-day validity period, if they have never been employed as a guest worker to Taiwan and have met the additional requirements listed below:

They are required to hold a residential or visitor visa (including Visa Waiver Registration Certificates issued by Japan to Indonesian nationals, and e-Visas), or a residential certificate (including permanent residency) issued by the following countries. The visa can be either valid or expired, but it must not have expired for more than 10 years prior to the date of arrival in Taiwan. Holders of work permits as well as visas marked "void", "cancelled" or "cancelled without prejudice" are not eligible. In addition, travelers utilizing the scheme must also hold a return or onward plane or ship ticket and will be required to present it to the immigration officer.

1 – excluding type FL, X and P visas, and resident cards with "foreign laborer" as the purpose of residence.

Frequent visitors to Taiwan from these countries can also receive multiple entry visas with validity of two to five years.

From 1 June 2017, nationals of these countries who have received a Taiwanese visa (other than a work visa) in the last 10 years are eligible for online registration.

As all Filipino nationals were exempt from visa requirements on 1 November 2017, they were no longer able to register for the certificate from that day onwards. All certificates were also no longer valid for entry since 31 October 2017. Passengers entering Taiwan prior to 1 November 2017 were still allowed to stay for up to 30 days, while those entering Taiwan on or after that day can only stay for up to 14 days.

The period of stay for nationals of all countries was shortened from 30 days to 14 days from 1 August 2018.

Taiwan Employment Gold Card
In 2018, the passing of the "Act for Recruitment and Employment of Foreign Professionals" created the Taiwan Employment Gold Card. In addition to being a visa, the Gold Card contains an open work permit and residence permit allowing a holder to reside and work in Taiwan for up to 3 years. All foreign nationals, including permanent residents from Hong Kong and Macao, are eligible to apply. The card aims to attract experienced professionals in the fields of Science and Technology, Education, Culture and Arts, Sport, Law, Architecture, and others beneficial to Taiwan's economy. Applicants must pass a skill qualification procedure involving the submission of documents to validate their claims.

Employment Seeking Visa
Also created with the passing of the "Act for Recruitment and Employment of Foreign Professionals" in 2018, was the Employment Seeking Visa. The Employment Seeking Visa allows applicants with work experience having a salary more than double the minimum wage in Taiwan (a salary of more than NT$47,971 in 2020), and those who just graduated from a "Top 500" university to acquire a six-month multi-entry visitor visa.

Chinese travelers domiciled in Mainland China

Chinese nationals with residency (hukou) in Mainland China (including those who are non-permanent residents of Hong Kong or Macau and have relinquished their hukou in Mainland China) require prior approvals from the Taiwanese government and are required to hold an Exit and Entry Permit prior to traveling to Taiwan. As of August 2016, Mainland residents can only visit Taiwan as a part of a pre-approved tour group unless they qualify for one of the exemptions:
They reside outside Mainland China and hold temporary or permanent residence status in Hong Kong, Macau or a third country (prior approval from the Chinese authorities is not required when departing from a place other than Mainland China); or, 
They only visit Quemoy, Matsu, and Penghu Islands (in which case a 15-day Exit and Entry Permit Permit can be obtained on arrival provided holding certain travel documents) and will not proceed to other parts of Taiwan.

As of May 2016, Mainland resident visitors applying from Mainland China are subject to a daily quota imposed by Taiwan of 14,600 persons per day, with half of the quota available to individual tour applicants. Those who applied from Hong Kong, Macau or a third country are not subject to a quota. It was reported that the Chinese authorities also has an unofficial "soft cap" on the numbers of individual and group tourists, ranging from 40% to 50% of the Taiwanese quota.

All Mainland residents cannot travel to Taiwan on their passports when departing from Mainland China and must hold a Travel Permit to and from Taiwan, colloquially known as Mainland Resident Travel Permit, issued by the Chinese authorities. The current card-type version of the permit is similar to the design of the Two-way permit while older version is a pink, passport-like travel document. Permits must have the appropriate valid exit endorsements (similar to exit visas) on them for the holder to depart from Mainland China. Although travelling with the Mainland Resident Travel Permit is not mandatory when departing from Hong Kong, Macau or a third country, the Exit and Entry Permit itself is not a travel document but a de facto entry visa, and is usually tied to the document number of Mainland Resident Travel Permit or the Chinese passport, hence the travelers are still required to carry the travel document they used to apply for the Exit and Entry Permit when travelling to Taiwan.

Since January 2016, Mainland residents are no longer required to hold a Mainland Resident Travel Permit if they depart from airports in Chongqing, Kunming or Nanchang and are only in transit through Taiwan to a third country. Otherwise, the Mainland Resident Travel Permit with exit endorsement is also required for transit through Taiwan if departing from Mainland China, but the Exit and Entry Permit is not required if the passengers do not pass immigration control in Taiwan and only remain airside.

From 28 March 2017, Mainland Chinese residents are able to apply for the Exit and Entry Permit online if they are residing in a third country.

Currently all issuance of visit permits to mainland Chinese residents are suspended due to coronavirus pandemic.

Restrictions for former Mainland residents
Although the aforementioned restrictions do not apply to former nationals of China with Mainland residency as well as Hong Kong and Macau residents who have relinquished their hukou, they also face entry restrictions and are required to apply for an Exit and Entry Permit unless they meet the following requirements:

They have resided outside of Mainland China for more than 4 years;
They have obtained the nationality of the country in which they reside (or permanent residence status of Hong Kong or Macau); and
They have lost their Chinese nationality in pursuant to Article 9 of the Chinese nationality law (not required for Hong Kong or Macau permanent residents).

If the requirements are met, they may enter Taiwan according to the visa requirements of the nationality they have acquired, or as residents of Hong Kong and Macau as listed above. However, documentation supporting the change in nationality or residence status, such as a naturalization certificate or a Home Return Permit, is required.

Special visa requirements for nationals of certain countries
Taiwan has special entry requirements for nationals of certain countries. Nationals of countries mentioned below may only visit Taiwan when one of the following requirements is met:

 They are invited by Taiwanese government agencies when on official businesses.
 They are participating in international meetings or activities for the purposes of "religious, athletic, or cultural exchange" and invited by a Taiwanese organization.
 They have dependents with legal residence status in Taiwan (spouse, family members of "lineal relationship", or siblings only).
 They are "conducting economic or commercial businesses" in Taiwan. Accompanied spouse and children may also receive visitor visas.
 They are crew members boarding a ship docked in Taiwan.
 They are receiving medical treatment in Taiwan.

In addition, those who are visiting Taiwan on business must be interviewed by a Taiwanese consular officer, and their sponsors in Taiwan must submit a guarantee to the Bureau of Consular Affairs in Taiwan.

Countries marked with * may also apply for tourist visas, and they are not required to submit a guarantee from their Taiwanese sponsors when applying for business visas.

The list of the countries is as follows:

In addition, the requirements also apply to holders of Indian Identity Certificates.

Working Holiday Visa
Nationals of the following 15 countries are eligible to apply for the Taiwanese working holiday visa (named as "Youth Mobility Scheme" for British and Canadian citizens) through Taiwanese diplomatic missions of their countries of nationality, if they are ordinary residents in their country of nationality and are within the age limits.

1 – for British citizens residing in United Kingdom only.

Statistics
Most visitors arriving to Taiwan on short-term basis were from the following countries of residence:

See also

 Exit & Entry Permit
 Foreign relations of Taiwan
 Taiwan passport
 Visa requirements for Taiwanese citizens

References

External links
 Bureau of Consular Affairs
 List of Taiwanese Diplomatic Missions
 National Immigration Agency English Website

Foreign relations of Taiwan
Taiwan